Ernest Archer (26 July 1910 – 27 July 1990) was a British art director. He won an Oscar and was nominated for another in the category Best Art Direction.

Selected filmography
Archer won an Academy Award for Best Art Direction and was nominated for another:
Won
 Nicholas and Alexandra (1971)
Nominated
 2001: A Space Odyssey (1968)

References

External links

1910 births
1990 deaths
British art directors
Best Art Direction Academy Award winners
Best Production Design BAFTA Award winners